The 1999 Sydney International women's singles was the singles event of the fourteenth edition of the ASB Classic; a WTA Tier II tournament and the second most prestigious women's tennis tournament held in Australia. Arantxa Sánchez Vicario was the defending champion but lost in the quarterfinals to Barbara Schett.

Lindsay Davenport won in the final 6–4, 6–3 against Martina Hingis.

Seeds
The top four seeds received a bye to the second round.

Draw

Finals

Top half

Bottom half

Qualifying

Seeds

Qualifiers

Qualifying draw

First qualifier

Second qualifier

Third qualifier

Fourth qualifier

External links
 Singles and Doubles Main Draws

Women's Singles
Singles